The 1980 Woodpecker Welsh Professional Championship was a professional non-ranking snooker tournament, which took place in January 1980.

Doug Mountjoy won the tournament defeating Ray Reardon 9–6 in the final.

Main draw

References

Welsh Professional Championship
Welsh Professional Championship
Welsh Professional Championship
Welsh Professional Championship